The 28th Edition Vuelta a España (Tour of Spain), a long-distance bicycle stage race and one of the 3 grand tours, was held from April 26 to May 13, 1973. It consisted of 17 stages covering a total of 3,061 km, and was won by Eddy Merckx of the Molteni cycling team. As Merckx had already won several editions of the Tour de France and the Giro d'Italia with his win in the Vuelta, he became the third cyclist after Jacques Anquetil and Felice Gimondi to win all three grand tours in his career. Merckx went on to win the 1973 Giro d'Italia and became the first cyclist to win the Vuelta-Giro double. Merckx also won the points classification and José Luis Abilleira won the mountains classification. With Merckx finishing first, Ocaña second and Thévenet third the podium of the 1973 Vuelta contained one previous winner and two future winners of the Tour de France making it one of the best podiums in the history of the race, according to the official race website. Merckx won six stages in this edition and Gerben Karstens won four.

Teams

A total of eight teams were invited to participate in the 1973 Vuelta a España. Each team sent a squad of ten riders, which meant that the race started with a peloton of 80 cyclists. 62 cyclists reached the finish in San Sebastián.

The teams entering the race were:

Route and stages

Classification leadership

Four different jerseys were worn during the 1973 Vuelta a España. The leader of the general classification – calculated by adding the stage finish times of each rider, and allowing time bonuses for the first three finishers on mass-start stages – wore a golden jersey. This classification is the most important of the race, and its winner is considered as the winner of the Vuelta.

For the points classification, which awarded a light blue jersey to its leader, cyclists were given points for finishing a stage in the top 15; additional points could also be won in intermediate sprints. The green jersey was awarded to the mountains classification leader. In this ranking, points were won by reaching the summit of a climb ahead of other cyclists. Each climb was ranked as either first, second or third category, with more points available for higher category climbs. The combination classification awarded a red jersey to its leader.

Although no jersey was awarded, there was also one classification for the teams, in which the stage finish times of the best three cyclists per team were added; the leading team was the one with the lowest total time.

The rows in the following table correspond to the jerseys awarded after that stage was run.

Final standings

General Classification

Points classification

Mountains classification

Combination classification

Team classification

Intermediate sprints classification

ReferencesCitations'''

 
Vuelta a España
1973
Vuelta a España
Vuelta a España
Vuelta a España
1973 Super Prestige Pernod